The Popular Association "Odrodzenie-Wyzwolenie" was a centre-left political party in the Republic of Central Lithuania. Following the 1922 general elections, it held 5 seats in the Sejm of Central Lithuania. Its political programme was identical to the one of Polish People's Party "Wyzwolenie" that operated in Poland, and was based on agrarianism and agrarian socialism. It supported the authonomy of Central Lithuania from Poland, however it did not oppose the possible future federation with it, as proposed by Józef Piłsudski. Its leader was Ludwik Chomiński.

Citations

Notes

References 

Political parties in the Republic of Central Lithuania
Political parties disestablished in 1922
Centre-left parties in Europe
Defunct agrarian political parties
Defunct socialist parties in Europe